Deluxxx is Atach Tatuq's last studio album released on October 4, 2005. The album won the award for the Hip hop album of the year category at the Félix Awards in 2006.

Track listing
"Deluxxx 0001"
"Deluxxx"
"1-2..." (featuring DJ Nerve)
"Bags of Smile" (featuring Wyzah)
"Exer6 de style"
"Du monde comme nous"
"Me fume 2 joints"
"Chips"
"Pense-zi"
"Sex, Drug, Rap'N Roll"
"Kiss These"
"L'homme déçu / HD00"
"La symphonie d'ma discorde intérieure"
"Dans mon bout' ça niaise pas"
"Me fume du crack"
"Geahh Fool!" (featuring Die When)
"What Are Friendz For?!" (featuring Loe Pesci)
"Plastiq doré"
"Diapos"
"Australie" (featuring Lee)
"Chambre à gaz Feng Shui"

References

Atach Tatuq albums
2005 albums